Durageh-ye Aras Khan (also Romanized as Darageh-ye Oros Khān; also known as Darakeh-ye Oros Khān) is a village in Almahdi Rural District, Mohammadyar District, Naqadeh County, West Azerbaijan Province, Iran. At the 2006 census, its population was 319, in 83 families.

References 

Populated places in Naqadeh County